Xavier Saint-Macary (June 7, 1948 – March 13, 1988) was a French actor, brother of Hubert Saint-Macary.

Saint-Macary played in La Nuit américaine (1973) directed by François Truffaut and  Le Château perdu (1973). American audiences will remember him as the enthusiastic but bumbling Detective Fontenoy in the Disney movie Herbie Goes to Monte Carlo (1977).

Saint-Macary died of a sudden heart attack in 1988, a few months short of his 40th birthday.

Partial filmography

 Le Château perdu (1973, TV Movie) - Le comte de Guiche
 La Nuit américaine (1973) - Christian
 L'oiseau rare (1973) - Francis, l'amant de Renée
 Le Plein de Super (1976) - Philippe
 Herbie Goes to Monte Carlo (1977) - Detective Fontenoy
 Dites-lui que je l'aime (1977) - Michel Barbet
 Animal (1977) - Le chauffeur de Saint-Prix
 Pourquoi pas ! (1979) - Paul, le play-boy
 Le Cavaleur (1979) - Georges Jussieu
 Martin et Léa (1979) - Martin
 La Mémoire courte (1979) - Le mari de Judith
 Us Two (1979)
 Ce répondeur ne prend pas de message (1979) - L'homme
 Le point douloureux (1979) - Le serveur restaurant
 Ras le cœur (1980) - Roland
 Loulou (1980) - Bernard
 Du blues dans la tête (1981) - Jacky
 Men Prefer Fat Girls (1981) - Ronald
 Ma femme s'appelle reviens (1982) - Philippe
 Le Bourgeois gentilhomme (1982) - Dorante
 Confidentially Yours (1983) - Bertrand Fabre
 Signes extérieurs de richesse (1983) - Bianchi
 Détective (1985) - Accountant
 Le Débutant (1986) - Philippe Rivière
 Corps z'a corps (1988) - M. de Villecresne
 A Few Days with Me (1988) - Paul (final film role)

References

External links

1948 births
1988 deaths
Actors from Orléans
French male film actors
French male television actors
20th-century French male actors